Timothy Jonathon Ross (nicknamed Rosso) is an Australian comedian, radio host, writer and television presenter. He began his career performing stand-up comedy with Merrick Watts as part of the duo Merrick and Rosso. He is now better known as the presenter of the ABC shows Streets of Your Town and Designing a Legacy, which reflect his personal enthusiasm for design and architecture.

Education
Ross studied drama and music at the Royal Melbourne Institute of Technology and La Trobe University, also in Melbourne, graduating as a Bachelor of Arts.

Career

Live performance
Ross began his career in comedy, and first came together with Merrick Watts when they teamed up for a one off comedy show in 1996. They went on to appear in stand-up together very often, touring Australia and participating in many comedy festivals. They collaborated as authors too, co-authoring Merrick and Rosso, The Book and Merrick and Rosso, The Book Volume 2. As well as performing as a comedian, Ross has fronted the comedy band Black Rose, which opened the Vivofit festival in Melbourne and Sydney in 2009.

Radio
Ross began his careers with Merrick Watts at Triple J performing a weekly guest spot on the drive-time program on Triple J radio in 1998 as Merrick and Rosso. They became full-time presenters and then in 2001 they moved to newly launched commercial radio station Nova 96.9 for the breakfast radio shift. Co-hosts on the breakfast show included Katrina Blowers, Sami Lukis and Kate Ritchie. Ross left the successful radio program in 2009. At the end of 2011 Ross rejoined breakfast radio, signing for Sydney commercial radio station Mix 106.5 with co-host comedian Claire Hooper.

In December 2012, Mix 106.5 announced that Ross and Hooper would be replaced by a new breakfast show with Sami Lukis and Yumi Stynes in 2013. Tim was appointed drive presenter on the Mix Network with anchor Matt Baseley.

Television
The first television series hosted by Merrick and Rosso was Planet Merrick and Rosso (later known as Super Planet Merrick and Rosso) on The Comedy Channel. They had a guest role on top rating Australian drama series All Saints in 2003. In 2003 their television show Merrick and Rosso Unplanned debuted on the Nine Network followed by The B Team on Network Ten in 2005. In 2008, they returned to the Comedy Channel with an original format entitled 'The Merrick & Rosso Show'. In 2009, Ross became a guest entertainment reporter for Nine's Today.

In 2010, he hosted Uncharted, an unsigned band competition series on MTV Australia and became the host of television series Australia Versuson the Seven Network. In 2011, Ross joined Weekend Sunrise as a Weekend All Star replacing Paul Murray. He also hosted the third season of No Leave, No Life.

As of 2012, Ross has been a regular contributor to entertainment and lifestyle website Live4.

In 2016, Ross presented Streets of Your Town, a two part television documentary series about Australian modernist architecture, which was the most watched arts program on the ABC that year.

In 2021, Ross presented Designing A Legacy, a one-hour television documentary on the ABC, where Ross met with families whose lives had been shaped by iconic architecture.

Architecture and design 
Ross's interest in architecture has led to speaking engagements at The 50s and 60s House Symposium (Museum of Sydney), Home Series talks (Government House), Sydney Design Week, and he is an ambassador for Sydney Open. In 2012 Tim became a member of the Creative Services Advisory Committee for Sydney Living Museums. Ross spoke at the opening of the London Design Museum, gave the Heritage Council Address in 2018 in Melbourne and was a keynote speaker at the Culture of Lates Symposium in London.  In December 2018 he launched the "Home: A Suburban Obsession" exhibition at the State Library of Queensland.

He has written on architecture for various publications including Real Living, Habitus, The Saturday Paper, The Smith Journal, Qantas Magazine and The Guardian.

In 2019, Ross was awarded the prestigious National President's Prize from the Australian Institute of Architects for his advocacy work in architecture. 
Ross's two part series on Australian architecture, Streets of Your Town premiered on ABC TV in November 2016. Followed by Designing A Legacy in February 2021 on ABC TV.

Writing / Publishing 
In 2017, Ross launched his second book, The Rumpus Room, capturing nostalgic short stories about life in Australia's suburbs in the 1960s, 1970s and 1980s.

In collaboration with the National Archives of Australia, Ross created a coffee table book called MOTEL – Images of Australia on Holidays, released in 2019 in conjunction with his live show performed with best friend Kit Warhurst.

Scorcher, a collection of short stories on the Australian summer of the 70s and 80s was released in December 2021 and is now in its second print run.

Personal life
Ross is married to Michelle Glew-Ross and has two sons, Bugsy and Bobby.

Discography

Studio albums

Video albums

Singles

Awards and nominations

ARIA Music Awards
The ARIA Music Awards are a set of annual ceremonies presented by Australian Recording Industry Association (ARIA), which recognise excellence, innovation, and achievement across all genres of the music of Australia. They commenced in 1987.

! 
|-
| 1999 || Teenage Mullet Fury || rowspan="3"| ARIA Award for Best Comedy Release ||  || rowspan="3"| 
|-
| 2003 || From Us to Youse || 
|-
| 2008 || Live and Totally Wrong! ||

References

External links 

Nova (radio network) announcers
Triple J announcers
Living people
Place of birth missing (living people)
Year of birth missing (living people)
Australian stand-up comedians
Australian television presenters
Comedians from Melbourne
RMIT University alumni
La Trobe University alumni
Television personalities from Melbourne
Radio personalities from Melbourne